The Big Sky is a 1952 American Western film produced and directed by Howard Hawks and written by Dudley Nichols, based on the novel of the same name by A.B. Guthrie Jr. The cast includes Kirk Douglas, Dewey Martin, Elizabeth Threatt and Arthur Hunnicutt, who was nominated for an Academy Award for Best Supporting Actor. Though not considered among Hawks's major achievements by most critics, the film was chosen by Jonathan Rosenbaum for his alternative list of the Top 100 American Films.

Plot
In 1832, Jim Deakins (Kirk Douglas) is travelling in the wilderness when he encounters an initially hostile Boone Caudill (Dewey Martin). However, they soon become good friends and head together to St. Louis on the Missouri River in search of Boone's uncle, Zeb Calloway (Arthur Hunnicutt). They find him when they are tossed in jail for brawling with fur traders of the Missouri River Company. When 'Frenchy' Jourdonnais (Steven Geray) comes to bail Zeb out, Zeb talks him into paying for Jim and Boone too.

The two men join an expedition organised by Zeb and Frenchy, who owns a sailing barge called 'Mandan'. Taking about 30 other trappers with them, they begin to travel 2,000 miles up the Missouri and into the Yellowstone River to seek trade with the Blackfoot Indians, in competition with the Missouri Fur Company. Zeb has brought along Teal Eye (Elizabeth Threatt), a pretty Blackfoot woman Zeb had found several years earlier after she had escaped from an enemy tribe. She is the daughter of a chief and Zeb plans to return her to her family as a means of establishing trade with the tribe. On the journey, they encounter another Blackfoot that Zeb knows, Poordevil (Hank Worden); they take him along too. Later, Teal Eye falls into the river and is rescued from rapids by Boone.

The Missouri Company knows about the threat to their monopoly. One day, it makes its move. A party led by Streak (Jim Davis) captures Teal Eye and tries to burn the boat, but Frenchy wakes up before the fire causes much damage. Poordevil tracks the enemy and Zeb and Jim rescue the woman. Later the expedition puts in at a company trading post and leaves a warning not to interfere. A week later they repulse an attack by Crow Indians. Jim is separated from the group and shot in the leg. Boone, followed by Teal Eye and Poordevil, finds him, extracts the bullet and waits for his friend to heal. When they rejoin their band, they find Streak trying to buy the boat and the goods on it. Jim compares the bullet dug out of his leg with one of Streak's and finds them to be the same. Streak and his men are killed in the ensuing shootout.

The expedition finally reaches the Blackfoot village and begins trading. Teal Eye then tells a very disappointed Jim that she loves him... like a brother. Boone follows her back to her teepee. When he emerges much later, he is surprised to find out he is now married. However, Teal Eye makes him buy her from her father, so that he will be free to leave her any time he wants to. With winter coming on, the men soon begin the long return boat trip and Boone goes with them, abandoning Teal Eye. This cools the earlier friendship between Boone and Jim, who confides to Zeb that unlike Boone he would not have left if Teal Eye had chosen him instead. Later that evening, however, Boone changes his mind and decides to return to Teal Eye, which pleases Jim greatly, and the two men remain friends as they finally go their separate ways.

Cast
 Kirk Douglas as Jim Deakins
 Dewey Martin as Boone Caudill
 Elizabeth Threatt as Teal Eye
 Arthur Hunnicutt as Zeb Calloway
 Buddy Baer as Romaine, one of Frenchy's men
 Steven Geray as 'Frenchy' Jourdonnais
 Henri Letondal as Labadie
 Hank Worden as Poordevil
 Jim Davis as Streak

Reception
To improve business, the film's running time was reduced from 140 minutes to 122 minutes for its general release.

In 1998, Jonathan Rosenbaum of the Chicago Reader included the film in his unranked list of the best American films not included on the AFI Top 100.

Awards and nominations
The film was nominated for two Academy Awards:

 Academy Award for Best Supporting Actor – Arthur Hunnicutt
 Academy Award for Best Cinematography, Black-and-White – Russell Harlan

Home video releases
 1988 Turner Home Entertainment, RKO Collection, VHS,

Soundtrack releases
The eight-minute suite for The Big Sky was released on Lost Horizon: The Classic Film Scores of Dimitri Tiomkin (1976), performed by the National Philharmonic Orchestra conducted by Charles Gerhardt. Recorded in London in December 1975, the RCA Red Seal album was re-released on audio CD in 1991 and 2010. UPC 8-8697-77933-2-5

The original motion picture soundtrack for The Big Sky was restored by the Brigham Young University Film Music Archives for a 2003 compact disc release. The limited-edition CD (BYU FMADT111) includes 28 tracks and nearly 80 minutes of orchestral music.

References

External links
 
 
 
 

1952 films
1952 Western (genre) films
1950s historical films
1950s English-language films
American historical films
American Western (genre) films
American black-and-white films
Blackfoot in popular culture
Films scored by Dimitri Tiomkin
Films based on American novels
Films based on Western (genre) novels
Films directed by Howard Hawks
Films about Native Americans
Films set in 1832
Films with screenplays by Dudley Nichols
RKO Pictures films
1950s American films